Carmelo Pompilio Realino Antonio Bene, known as Carmelo Bene (1 September 1937 – 16 March 2002), was an Italian actor, poet, film director and screenwriter. He was an important exponent of the Italian avant-garde theatre and cinema. He died of a heart ailment in 2002.

Works

Literature
In 1979 he wrote, in collaboration with French philosopher Gilles Deleuze, the essay "Superpositions". In 1984 his play Adelchi was published. In 1970 he wrote the screenplay A Boccaperta.
 I Appeared to the Madonna, translated with a preface by Carole Viers-Andronico (Contra Mundum Press: 2020)

Partial filmography
 Oedipus Rex (1967, directed by Pier Paolo Pasolini) - Creonte
 Nostra Signora dei Turchi - Our Lady of the Turks (1968, director, Venice Film Festival Special Jury Prize) - The Man / Narrator
 Catch as Catch Can (1968) - Priest
 Capricci (1969, director) - Poet
 The Syndicate: A Death in the Family (1970) - Billy Desco
 Don Giovanni (1970, director) - Don Giovanni
 Necropolis (1970)
 Tre nel mille (1971)
 Salomè (1972, director) - Erode Antipa / Onorio
 One Hamlet Less (1973, director) - Hamlet
 Claro (1975)

Selected bibliography in English
 Carmelo Bene, I Appeared to the Madonna, tr. with a preface by Carole Viers-Andronico (New York: Contra Mundum Press, 2020).
 Carmelo Bene, "I am Non-Existent: Therefore I am," tr. by Carole Viers Andronico, Hyperion: On the Future of Aesthetics, Vol. VIII, No. 1 (spring 2014) 37–44.
 Carmelo Bene, “Being in Abandonment: Reading as Non-Memory,” tr. by Rainer J. Hanshe, Hyperion: On the Future of Aesthetics, Vol. VIII, No. 1 (spring 2014) 45–49.
 Carmelo Bene, "Well, yes, Gilles Deleuze!," tr. by Rainer J. Hanshe, Hyperion: On the Future of Aesthetics, Vol. VIII, No. 1 (spring 2014) 50–57.
 Carmelo Bene, Our Lady of the Turks, tr. with a preface by Carole Viers-Andronico (New York: Contra Mundum Press, 2021).
 Gilles Deleuze, "One Manifesto Less," tr. by Alan Orenstein. The Deleuze Reader, ed. by Constantin V. Boundas (New York: Columbia UP, 1993) 204–222.
 Gilles Deleuze, "Cinema, body and brain, thought," in Cinema 2: The Time-Image, tr. by Hugh Tomlinson & Robert Galeta (Minnesota: University of Minnesota Press, 1989) 190–191; 220.
 Gilles Deleuze, "Manfred: an Extraordinary Renewal," in Two Regimes of Madness, tr. by Ames Hodges & Mike Taormina (New York: Semiotext(e), 2006) 188-189.
 Tristan Grünberg, "Outrageous Salome: Grace and Fury in Carmelo Bene’s Salomè and Ken Russell’s Salome’s Last Dance," in Performing Salome, Revealing Stories, ed. by Clair Rowden (Abingdon; New York: Routledge, 2016) 171–189.
 Emilio Villa, "Litany for Carmelo Bene," tr. by Dominic Siracusa, Hyperion: On the Future of Aesthetics, Vol. VIII, No. 1 (spring 2014) 58–67.
 Amos Vogel, "Capricci," in Film as Subversive Art (New York: Random House, 1976).
 Amos Vogel, "Our Lady of the Turks," in Film as Subversive Art (New York: Random House, 1976).
 Amos Vogel, "Don Giovanni," in Film as Subversive Art (New York: Random House, 1976).

See also
Experimental theatre

References

Sources
 Umberto Artioli - Carmelo Bene, Un dio assente. Monologo a due voci, Antonio Attisani and Marco Dotti eds., Medusa, Milan, 2006. 
 Giuseppe Leone, "D'in su la vetta della torre antica. Giacomo Leopardi e Carmelo Bene sospesi fra silenzio e voce", Edizioni Il Melabò, Lecco, 2015.
Giuseppe Leone, "D'in su la vetta della torre antica. Giacomo Leopardi e Carmelo Bene sospesi fra silenzio e voce", II Edizione, Grafiche Rusconi, Bellano-Lecco, 2016.
Carlo Alberto Petruzzi, Carmelo Bene. Una bibliografia (1959-2018), Damocle edizioni, 2018, 182 pp.

External links

1937 births
2002 deaths
Italian atheists
Italian male stage actors
Italian male film actors
Italian film directors
Italian male screenwriters
20th-century Italian screenwriters
20th-century Italian male actors
Accademia Nazionale di Arte Drammatica Silvio D'Amico alumni
Deaths from cancer in Lazio
People from the Province of Lecce
20th-century Italian male writers